Pavel Petrovich Kharin (8 June 1927 – 6 March 2023) was a Soviet sprint canoeist who competed in the 1950s. Competing in two Summer Olympics, he won two medals at Melbourne in 1956 with a gold in the C-2 10000 m and a silver in the C-2 1000 m events.

Kharin died on 6 March 2023, at the age of 95.

References

Sources
Pavel Kharin's profile at Sports Reference.com
Article on Pavel Kharin's 90th birthday 

1927 births
2023 deaths
Canoeists at the 1952 Summer Olympics
Canoeists at the 1956 Summer Olympics
Soviet male canoeists
Olympic canoeists of the Soviet Union
Olympic gold medalists for the Soviet Union
Olympic silver medalists for the Soviet Union
Olympic medalists in canoeing
Russian male canoeists
Medalists at the 1956 Summer Olympics
Honoured Masters of Sport of the USSR
Sportspeople from Saint Petersburg